This article lists political parties in People's Republic of Bangladesh.

Bangladesh has a fading two-party system, which means that there are two dominant political parties, with extreme difficulty for anybody to achieve electoral success under the banner of another party.

However, though the center-left Awami League (AL) and center-right Bangladesh Nationalist Party (BNP) dominated Bangladesh politics for a long time, currently both are heading coalitions of like-minded parties with the AL leading the secular and liberal elements while BNP is rallying the right-of-centre parties.

Currently in the Parliament

These are all of the political parties that holds at least a seat in the Bangladeshi Parliament

Alliances

Grand Alliance

The Grand Alliance (মহাজোট) also known as the 14 Party Alliance is a coalition government in Bangladesh that formed in 2008 and consisted of the Bangladesh Awami League, Jatiya Party, Jatiya Samajtantrik Dal- JASAD, Workers Party  and nine other parties.

The Liberal Democratic Party left the Grand Alliance before the election and contested independently. It joined the 18 Party Alliance in 2012.

Left Democratic Alliance
The Left Democratic Alliance''' is an alliance of 8 Leftist Political parties including Communist Party of Bangladesh, Basad, Revolutionary Workers Party of Bangladesh, United Communist League Of Bangladesh, Ganatantrik Biplobi Party, Bam Gonotantrik Andolon and Gonoshonghoti Andolon.

Major parties

Bangladesh Awami League

Bangladesh Nationalist Party

Jatiya Party (Ershad)

Registered parties 
These are all the parties that are currently registered under Election Commission.

Regional parties

Unregistered parties
 Bangladesh Jamaat-e-Islami
 Nagorik Oikya
 Bangalee Janatatantrik Party (BJP)
 Hindu Republican Party
 Ganasamhati Andolon
 United National Party
 Maoist Bolshevik Reorganisation Movement of the Purba Banglar Sarbahara Party
 National Movement
 Purba Banglar Sarbahara Party
 Bangladesh Gano Odhikar Parishad
 Amar Bangladesh Party-AB Party
 Noitik Shomaj
 Bangladesh Justice Party 
 Bangladesh National Democratic League President: Khandaker Enamul Nasir
 Nation State Movement (NSM), National Chairman: Jatiprodhan Rafiqus Samad Choudhury

See also

 Politics of Bangladesh
 List of political parties by country

References

Bangladesh
Political parties
 
Political parties
Bangladesh